Neda Hassani (1977 – 23 June 2003) was an Iranian dissident.

History
Neda Hassani was born to Ahmed and Foroogh Hassani, as the eldest child of an Iranian family of three children. The family left Iran in the early 1980s, taking refuge in Greece before settling in Ottawa, Ontario, Canada.  Hassani attended Carleton University, studying computer science.

Hassani was a supporter of the People's Mujahedin of Iran, as of 1988, following the execution of her uncle, Mahmoud Hassani, in Iran.  She was not a member of the organisation, according to her parents.  Mahmoud Hassani was the younger brother of her father, and had been imprisoned for seven years in Iran, prior to his execution.   As a child, Hassani had visited her uncle in prison.  Her uncle was among a group of an estimated 35,000 dissidents executed at that time.  Hassani's support for the Mujahedin led her to move to Paris, to join the National Council of Resistance of Iran.

On 17 June 2003, Hassani was on holiday in London, when police in France raided the headquarters of the People's Mojahedin of Iran, holding approximately 160 members for questioning, including Maryam Rajavi, a co-leader of the group, with her husband, Massoud Rajavi.  The group was suspected of planning attacks against Iranian interests in Europe.  Hassani later joined  a student protest at the French embassy in London, protesting the arrest in France and possible deportation to Iran of Rajavi and other members of the Mujahedin. There was a discussion among some of the protesters of protesting via self-immolation.  Hassani was quoted as saying "We all think of doing that", despite the fact that co-leader Maryam Rajavi expressed her opposition to suicidal protests. On the evening of 18 June, at approximately 7:15 p.m.,  Hassani returned, alone, to the front of the French embassy in London, where she doused herself in gasoline and set herself on fire.  She was found two hours later, and subsequently died in hospital on 23 June, in the presence of her mother, having never regained consciousness.

Hassani was one of four people who set themselves on fire in front of the French embassy in London, in the days following the arrests of Mujahedin members in France. Another of the four, Heshmat Zandi, a 38-year-old engineering student, also died.  During the same period, three people set themselves on fire in Paris, one of whom, Sedighieh Mohageri, died, while another person was prevented from setting himself on fire, after dousing himself with gasoline in front of the French embassy in Switzerland.

Hassani's body was returned to Canada for burial. At Hassani's funeral, on 30 June 2003, Hassani's mother expressed pride in her daughter's actions. She also expressed similar sentiments in England, immediately following her daughter's death, while discouraging others from following her daughter's example.

Hassani is buried at Pinecrest Cemetery, Ottawa.

References

1977 births
2003 suicides
People from Tehran
Iranian women activists
People's Mojahedin Organization of Iran members
Suicides by self-immolation
Date of birth missing